The 1997 Saskatchewan Roughriders finished in 3rd place in the West Division with an 8–10 record and lost in the 85th Grey Cup game to the Doug Flutie-led Toronto Argonauts. Despite finishing the season tied with the BC Lions, the Roughriders were placed above the Lions after winning the season series three games to one. The 'Riders proceeded to upset the Calgary Stampeders by a score of 33–30 in the West-Semi Final and then defeated the favoured Edmonton Eskimos 31–30 to proceed to the Grey Cup game.

Offseason

CFL draft

Ottawa Rough Riders Dispersal Draft

Preseason

Regular season

Season standings

Season schedule

Roster

Awards and records

CFL All-Star Selections
Bobby Jurasin, Defensive End
John Terry, Offensive Tackle

Western All-Star Selections
Bobby Jurasin, Defensive End
John Terry, Offensive Tackle

Milestones

References

Saskatchewan Roughriders seasons
N. J. Taylor Trophy championship seasons
Saskatchewan